Life In The Dirty District is the second album by Dirty District. the album has more of experimentation than the previous recording, as the band cross into more Rap Metal and Techno genres. the album was produced by Dennis Morris, who gained fame at a young age for being a photographer for John Lydon. there are also samples from the English version of the 1971 movie, The Island of Dr. Moreau, which Rap Group house of pain also sampled on their first album, Fine Malt Lyrics.

Track listing
"50"
"Lies"
"Wonderland"
"Big Shot, Big Shit"
"N.Y Crap"
"Freaks"
"A Dub"
"Jump In The Lake"
"3"
"Techno"
"Stop The Violence"
"Blah Blah"
"Am I Dead Yet?"
"Symphony..."

Dirty District albums
1993 albums